This article lists political parties in Ceuta.

The parties

Most of the Spanish political parties are active in Ceuta. In addition are the following regional parties:

Ceutan Democratic Union (Unión Democráta Ceutí)
Democratic and Social Party of Ceuta (Partido Democrático y Social de Ceuta)
Socialist Party of the People of Ceuta (Partido Socialista del Pueblo de Ceuta)
Union of Muslims of Ceuta (Unión de Musulmanes de Ceuta)

See also
 List of political parties by country

Ceuta
 
Ceuta